Iosif Bükössy (12 August 1936 – 30 October 2006) was a Romanian footballer who played as a forward. After he retired from playing football he worked mainly at Farul Constanța's youth center where he taught and formed generations of players, which include Gheorghe Hagi, Ianis Zicu and Vasile Mănăilă.

Honours
CCA București
Divizia A: 1956
Dinamo București
Cupa României: 1958–59

References

1936 births
2006 deaths
Romanian footballers
Association football forwards
Liga I players
Liga II players
CS Gaz Metan Mediaș players
FC Steaua București players
FCV Farul Constanța players
CS Portul Constanța players
FC Dinamo București players
Victoria București players
Romanian football managers
People from Mediaș